62nd meridian may refer to:

62nd meridian east, a line of longitude east of the Greenwich Meridian
62nd meridian west, a line of longitude west of the Greenwich Meridian